Selma Al-Radi (July 23, 1939 – October 7, 2010) was an Iraqi archaeologist who began and led the over twenty-year restoration of the Amiriya Madrasa, which is under consideration as a UNESCO World Heritage Site.

Biography

Selma Al-Radi was born in Baghdad, Iraq, but her childhood was spent in Iran and later in India, where her father Muhammed Selim Al-Radi was the Iraqi Ambassador. She obtained her BA at the University of Cambridge in Akkadian, Hebrew and Persian. Her tutor was Joan Oates, a noted Mesopotamian archaeologist. After graduation, she returned to Baghdad, where she began working in the National Museum of Iraq.

Along with her cousin Lamya Gailani, they were the first women in Iraq to go on archaeological excavations as representatives of the archaeological service. One of her first assignments was to accompany the team led by David Oates (the husband of her tutor), which discovered a large cache of the celebrated Nimrud Ivories, many of which were restored by Selma, giving her a first taste of restoration. She then obtained her master's degree in Art History and Archeology at Columbia University in New York in 1967 under the tutelage of Edith Porada. On her return, she continued to work in the Department of Antiquities and the Museum. The family left Iraq to settle in Beirut, where Selma began teaching at the American University of Beirut (1969–1974). She enrolled in the University of Amsterdam for her PhD degree. Her supervisors were Maurits van Loon from Amsterdam and Edith Porada from Columbia University. The University of Amsterdam did not require students to be resident for their graduate degrees after all their courses were completed. Her PhD research was performed on a Bronze Age site in Cyprus, Phlamoudhi Vounari, and her thesis was published in 1983.

In 1977, she took on the position of an adviser to the National Museum of Yemen in Sana'a, and Yemen was to remain the focus of most of her work. There, she conducted many archaeological surveys, participated in digs, energized the field of restoration of buildings especially mud brick palaces in the Hadhramawt. But her chef d'oeuvre was to be the restoration of the Amiriya Madrasa, probably not a madrassa (school) but rather a large palace with a beautiful small mosque. In collaboration with the Antiquites Department led by Qadi Ismail Al-Aqwa', she began in 1983 to restore the structure of this massive building which was about to fall down. Using local craftsmen whose expertise was handed down in the same families for generations, she resuscitated the ancient medieval craft of building in Yemen. In particular, she re-invented the ancient plastering method of qudad, a waterproofing cement similar in many ways to ancient Roman pozzolana. After laborious experimentation, they discovered the correct mixtures of volcanic ash and slaked lime. The results were published in 1995. The large cadre of masons and qudad workers became a school of restoration after the project gained international attention. Many of the workers were hired to restore old mansions in Yemen or to use the same methods to build new ones there. She was a tireless campaigner for raising funds for the building restoration from the Dutch and Yemeni governments.

When the structure was stabilized, she turned her attention to the beautifully painted mosque. The sanctuary was painted with murals in colorful designs, part of a long tradition of painted wooden and plaster ceilings in Yemen from the early medieval period on. Selma had documented the existence of these painted mosques, a unique feature in Islamic architecture, and Yemen was particularly rich in these structures. Selma documented as many as 40 of these mosques. A five-year project began with the Centro di Conservazione Archaeologica in Rome led by Roberto Nardi to conserve and restore the paintings. Students were involved in the training.  Selma herself cleaned the intricately carved stucco decoration which had been covered with decades of whitewash using fine dental tools. The result was magnificent. Another book followed with emphasis on restoration of the stucco and paintings. The New York Times described the project as "an immense undertaking" and the madrasa as "one of the great treasures of Islamic art and architecture."

Awards
In 2005 Al-Radi received the Yemen Presidential Medal of Culture. In 2007. In 2007, Al-Radi and Yahya Al-Nasiri received the Aga Khan Award for Architecture for their work in the restoration.

Family
Al-Radi was the sister of Nuha al-Radi, the author of Baghdad Diaries."  Al-Radi was married to Qais Al-Awqati, a Professor of Medicine and Physiology at Columbia University. Her son Rakan Ammar Zahawi from her first marriage is an environmental scientist who is the head of the Las Cruces Biological Station in Costa Rica.

References

External links
 Caterina Borelli, 2012, A Documentary on the renovation of the ‘Amiryia Madrasa and Mosque in Rada, Yemen, using the ancient waterproofing technique with qudad.

1939 births
2010 deaths
Iraqi archaeologists
Iraqi women archaeologists
Alumni of the University of Cambridge
Columbia Graduate School of Arts and Sciences alumni
University of Amsterdam alumni
People from Baghdad
Deaths from cancer in New York (state)
20th-century archaeologists
21st-century archaeologists
21st-century Iraqi women writers
20th-century Iraqi women writers